OJSC Ak Bars Aero, formerly OJSC Bugulma Air Enterprise, was an airline with its head office at Bugulma Airport in Bugulma, Russia. It operated regional scheduled and charter passenger services. Its main base was Bugulma Airport.

Due to financial difficulties, the airline filed for bankruptcy and suspended scheduled passenger services from 12 January 2015 and planned to lease its fleet of 15 CRJ-200 aircraft to other airlines.

History
The airline was formed in 1993 as Bugulma Air Enterprise from the former Aeroflot division based at Bugulma. The airline was renamed Ak Bars Aero in 2010.

Destinations
As of February 2014, AK Bars Aero operated to the following destinations:

International destinations

 Baku – Heydar Aliyev International Airport

Simferopol – Simferopol International Airport

Domestic destinations
 Astrakhan Oblast
 Astrakhan – Narimanovo Airport
 Bashkortostan
 Ufa – Ufa International Airport
 Belgorod Oblast
 Belgorod – Belgorod International Airport
 Chuvashia
 Cheboksary – Cheboksary Airport
 Chelyabinsk Oblast
 Chelyabinsk – Balandino Airport
 Magnitogorsk – Magnitogorsk Airport
 Krasnodar Krai
 Sochi – Adler-Sochi International Airport
 Kaliningrad Oblast
 Kaliningrad – Khrabrovo Airport
 Kirov Oblast
 Kirov – Pobedilovo Airport
 Kursk Oblast
 Kursk – Kursk Vostochny Airport
 Mari El
 Yoshkar-Ola – Yoshkar-Ola Airport
 Mordovia
 Saransk – Saransk Airport
 Moscow /  Moscow Oblast
 Moscow – Domodedovo International Airport (secondary hub)
 Nizhny Novgorod Oblast
 Nizhny Novgorod – Strigino Airport
 Novosibirsk Oblast
 Novosibirsk – Tolmachevo Airport
 Penza Oblast
 Penza – Penza Airport
 Perm Krai
 Perm – Bolshoye Savino Airport
 Rostov Oblast
 Rostov-on-Don – Rostov-on-Don Airport
 Samara Oblast
 Samara – Kurumoch International Airport
 Saratov Oblast
 Saratov – Saratov Tsentralny Airport
 St Petersburg /  Leningrad Oblast
 St Petersburg – Pulkovo International Airport
 Stavropol Krai
Mineralnye Vody – Mineralnye Vody Airport
 Sverdlovsk Oblast
Yekaterinburg – Koltsovo Airport
 Tatarstan
 Bugulma – Bugulma Airport (hub)
 Kazan – Kazan International Airport (hub)
 Nizhnekamsk / Naberezhnye Chelny – Begishevo Airport
 Tyumen Oblast
 Khanty-Mansi Autonomous Okrug
 Nizhnevartovsk – Nizhnevartovsk Airport
 Yamalo-Nenets Autonomous Okrug
 Novy Urengoy – Novy Urengoy Airport
 Ulyanovsk Oblast
Ulyanovsk – Ulyanovsk Baratayevka Airport

Fleet
The Bugulma Air Enterprise fleet consists of the following aircraft (as of December 2012)

Fixed-wing aircraft fleet

Helicopter fleet

See also
 UVT Aero

References

External links

 Ak Bars Aero official website 

Defunct airlines of Russia
Former Aeroflot divisions
Airlines established in 1953
1953 establishments in the Soviet Union
Companies based in Tatarstan